Jow may refer to:
 Jow (unit), an obsolete unit of length in India
 Jo L. Walton (born 1982), British poet also publishing as Jow Lindsay
 Jowulu language
 Malese Jow (born 1991), American actress and singer-songwriter
 Zhou (surname)